The 2010–11 season is Futebol Clube do Porto's 77th season in the Primeira Liga, officially known as the Liga ZON Sagres for sponsorship reasons. Porto captured their 25th league title with their 3 April defeat of rivals Benfica and won the Europa League. The team also won the Taça de Portugal, completing a treble. Manager Jesualdo Ferreira left Porto by mutual agreement after four years in charge, replaced by André Villas-Boas on 2 July.

Team kits

The team kits for the 2010–11 season were produced by Nike. The home kit was revealed on 24 July 2011. This kit is a reinterpretation of the traditional blue and white stripes in order to guarantee a 3D effect. The away kit is orange for the first time since the 2005–06 season, and was revealed on 18 July 2011. Both kits were made entirely from polyester. This environmentally-friendly move see each shirt made from up to eight recycled plastic bottles.

Squad

First team squad
As of 15 September 2011. F.C. Porto First Team Squad 2010-11

Transfers

Transfers in

Total spending:  €29,100,000

Transfers out

Total income:  €36,420,000

Statistics

Appearances and goals

Top scorers
Includes all competitive matches. The list is sorted by shirt number when total goals are equal.

Last 16

|}

See also
List of unbeaten football club seasons

References

External links
 FC Porto official website
 UEFA Champions League
 2010-11 FC Porto Season at ESPN
 Portal dos Dragões
 Social networking for FC Porto fans
 FCPorto-videos.net

2010-11
Portuguese football clubs 2010–11 season
2010-11
2010-11
2010–11 UEFA Europa League participants seasons